There are 240 NCAA Division III football programs in the United States. Teams and conference affiliations are current for the 2023 season.

NCAA Division III football programs

Future Division III football programs

Former NCAA Division III football programs

Notes

See also
NCAA Division III Football Championship
List of NCAA Division III Football Championship appearances by team
List of NCAA Division III institutions
List of NCAA Division I institutions
List of NCAA Division II institutions
List of NCAA Division I FBS football programs
List of NCAA Division I FCS football programs
List of NCAA Division II football programs
List of NAIA football programs
List of community college football programs
List of colleges and universities with club football teams
List of NCAA Division I schools that have never sponsored football
List of defunct college football teams

References

General

Specific

External links
D3football.com

NCAA Division III
 
Football
Football